Bilal Asad (born November 17, 1978 in Jhang) is a former Pakistani cricketer. He played 121 first-class, 75 List A and 9 Twenty20 matches between 1995 and 2006 for various teams.

He has also coached Singapore national cricket team and Malaysia national cricket team.

References

External links
 

1978 births
Living people
Allied Bank Limited cricketers
Islamabad cricketers
Islamabad Leopards cricketers
Khan Research Laboratories cricketers
Pakistani cricket coaches
Pakistani cricketers
Pakistani expatriates in Malaysia
Cricketers from Jhang
Public Works Department cricketers
Rawalpindi cricketers
Rawalpindi Rams cricketers
Sui Southern Gas Company cricketers
Zarai Taraqiati Bank Limited cricketers
Coaches of the Malaysia national cricket team